"Taiyou Scandalous" is the 13th major single (16th overall) released by the Japanese band Scandal. It was released in three editions: two Special Unit Editions and a Band Edition with different b-sides. The title track was produced by NAOTO (guitarist and leader of the group Orange Range), and it was used as the Itoen's "Stylee Sparkling" commercial song. The single reached #2 on the Oricon on its first week and charted for 6 weeks selling 39,033 copies.

Track listing

2012 singles
Scandal (Japanese band) songs
Epic Records singles
2012 songs